Salt River Township is an inactive township in Shelby County, in the U.S. state of Missouri.

Salt River Township was named after the North Fork Salt River.

References

Townships in Missouri
Townships in Shelby County, Missouri